Juan Andres Larré (born August 5, 1967 in San José de Mayo, Uruguay) is a retired professional footballer. He played as an attacking midfielder.

External links
Juan Andres Larré profile at chamoisfc79.fr

1967 births
Living people
Uruguayan footballers
Uruguay international footballers
Association football midfielders
C.A. Bella Vista players
Chamois Niortais F.C. players
AC Ajaccio players
Club Nacional de Football players
Angers SCO players
Ligue 1 players
Ligue 2 players